Alpavat (also Romanized as Alpāvat and Ālpāvot) is a village in Mavazekhan-e Sharqi Rural District, Khvajeh District, Heris County, East Azerbaijan Province, Iran. At the 2006 census, its population was 69, in 19 families.

Name 
According to Vladimir Minorsky, the name of this village is derived from the Mongolian word alpā'ut, which referred to "a privileged class".

References 

Populated places in Heris County